The tenth Sarawak state election was held on Saturday, 16 April 2011 after nomination for candidates on Wednesday, 6 April 2011. The purpose of the election was to elect 71 representatives to the Sarawak State Assembly. The ninth state assembly was dissolved by Yang di-Pertua Negeri Sarawak, Tun Abang Muhammad Salahuddin Abang Barieng on the advice of Chief Minister Abdul Taib Mahmud on 21 March 2011.
 The previous state election in Sarawak was held in 2006.

The election resulted in Barisan Nasional (BN) retaining its two-thirds majority, albeit by a reduced margin. BN lost eight seats, mainly through the Sarawak United People's Party (SUPP). SUPP leader and deputy chief minister George Chan Hong Nam lost his seat. The opposition Pakatan Rakyat made gains, but fell short of its goal to deny a two-thirds majority for BN. The party with the single biggest gain on the day was the Democratic Action Party (DAP), which doubled its seats to 12.

Taib, who had served as Chief Minister for 30 years, was sworn in for his eighth term on the same night. Wong Ho Leng was reappointed as opposition leader after his party (DAP) won the most seats for the opposition bench. Before this, Baru Bian was being nominated as chief minister-in-waiting by Pakatan Rakyat.

Background
Before the dissolution of Sarawak State Assembly, the Sarawak branch of the federal ruling coalition Barisan Nasional  held 63 state seats, of which the Parti Pesaka Bumiputera Bersatu had 35 seats, Sarawak United People's Party 12 seats, Parti Rakyat Sarawak 8 seats and Sarawak Progressive Democratic Party 8 seats. The opposition parties held eight seats in total; the federal opposition coalition Pakatan Rakyat had seven seats (Democratic Action Party had six, and Parti Keadilan Rakyat had one), while the remaining one seat was held by Parti Cinta Malaysia.

This election has become the biggest in the state history, whereby 213 candidates are vying for 71 seats. Barisan Nasional fielded candidates for all 71 seats, of which Parti Pesaka Bumiputera Bersatu, is contesting 35 seats, followed by 19 for Sarawak United People's Party, 9 to the Parti Rakyat Sarawak and 8 to the Sarawak Progressive Democratic Party. Pakatan Rakyat which was formed without a chairman in April 2010, fielded candidates in 69 seats out of the 71 seats, of which 49 candidates were from Parti Keadilan Rakyat, 15 seats from Democratic Action Party and five seats from Pan-Malaysian Islamic Party. Sarawak National Party (SNAP), despite being a member of the Pakatan Raykat, fielded its own candidates in 27 constituencies after negotiations with Parti Keadilan Rakyat broke down. It has nevertheless announced that it will support Baru Bian, the Pakatan candidate for chief minister, if it wins any seats.

The election also marks the debut of the Parti Cinta Malaysia, which is not affiliated with Pakatan Rakyat or Barisan Nasional and is contesting in 6 seats.  Another newcomer is Parti Ekonomi Rakyat Sarawak Bersatu (PERSB) (English: United Sarawak People's Economic Party) vying 16 seats. However PERSB were forced to contest as independent candidates as their party application has yet to be approved by Registrar of Societies (ROS) and during the nomination day, one of PERSB's candidate for N.58 Jepak was rejected by the Election Commission (EC).

Timeline

Election issues 

During the election, the opposition began painting the ruling Barisan Nasional coalition in a bad light by pointing to the impounding on Alkitab or Bahasa Malaysia bibles, saying that they were anti-Christian.

Another election issue that the opposition has brought up was regarding the long tenure of Chief Minister Taib Mahmud and his refusal to resign and appoint a successor.  The issue went in hand with them pointing out his alleged amassing of a huge fortune while in office which has been revealed in numerous websites, especially the Sarawak Report. Other reasons include fuel hike, land lease issue, state government contracts, open tender, and Chinese language education non-dominant parties perceived as weak partner in the state government, and weak party organisation and publicity. On government contracts, many Chinese businessmen were increasingly concerned about the lack of transparency and accountability on the awarding of the contracts. Several large infrastructure projects were awarded without notice or an open tender.

Results

Summary
A total of 18,363 eligible postal voters will be voting this time around in the Sarawak state election. Under Malaysian electoral law, teachers, military personnel, policemen and students based away from their constituencies are eligible to submit postal votes.

Although analysts predicted that Barisan Nasional's fight to keep their two-thirds majority in the assembly would be close, they emerged with a relatively comfortable result, finishing the night with 55 seats, above the 47 needed for a two-thirds majority. Prime minister Najib Razak celebrated the victory as an indication that BN's support in Sarawak was still strong and noted that Pakatan Rakyat had failed to make major inroads into the state.

BN won the election on the back of uneven performances by its component parties. The Parti Pesaka Bumiputera Bersatu (PBB) led by Taib won all their seats contested, but the Sarawak United People's Party (SUPP) did poorly, with their leader, George Chan Hong Nam losing his seat as well. The SUPP suffered a net loss of five seats, all to the Democratic Action Party (DAP), the same number it lost during the previous election. It won six out of 19 seats contested.

The opposition parties also had differing performances in the election. The DAP won 12 out of 15 seats contested and made the biggest gain of the day with six additional seats, while the Parti Keadilan Rakyat (PKR) won only 3 seats out of 49 contested, gaining only two seats. PKR leaders still described the result as "historic" and a step towards a two-party system in the state. Meanwhile, the local Sarawak National Party (SNAP) and peninsula-based Pan-Malaysian Islamic Party (PAS) failed to win any seats with some candidates losing their deposits.

Results by constituency

 
*Dr Johnichal Rayong, who won the N28 Engkilili seat on SNAP ticket, joined SUPP in December 2010, contributed another seat for BN.

**Gabriel Adit Demong previously an independent for N43 Ngemah constituency joined PKR in November 2008. He later quit PKR and joined Parti Cinta Malaysia in December 2009.

***AMENDMENTS TO THE EXISTING NAMES OF STATE CONSTITUENCIES: N19 Mambong (Origin N16 Bengoh), N34 Batang Ai (Origin N29 Batang Air), N41 Kuala Rajang (Origin N35 Belawai), N68 Tanjong Batu (Origin N59 Kidurong)

Aftermath
As the DAP remained the largest opposition party in the assembly, its state chief Wong Ho Leng kept his position as state opposition leader.

Meanwhile, PKR decided to petition the Elections Court to declare the Senadin contest null and void, citing irregularities during the polling process. SUPP candidate Lee Kim Shin beat PKR's Michael Teo in the contest by 58 votes. Election observers have alleged abuse of postal votes in the constituency by authorities to help Lee win.

References

External links
 Keputusan Rasmi Pilihan Raya Umum DUN Sarawak ke-10 (Official results) 

Sarawak
Sarawak state elections
April 2011 events in Asia